Keelapanaiyur  is a village in the Arimalamrevenue block of Pudukkottai district 
, Tamil Nadu, India.

Demographics 

As per the 2001 census, Keelapanaiyur had a total population of  
2024 with 946 males and 1078 females. Out of the total  
population 1155 people were literate.

References

Villages in Pudukkottai district